Galician Unity (UG) was a Galician nationalist and democratic socialist party formed by the Galician Socialist Party-Galician Left (PSG-EG) in 1991.

History
UG was founded as the successor of the PSG-EG in 1991. Despite this the PSG-EG would not fully disappear until 1993. The party presented a coalition with United Left (EU) for the Galician elections of 1993 and for the Spanish elections of the same year, failing to gain any seats in both. In fact, UG, lost the 2 MPs that the PSG-EG had in the Parliament of Galicia between 1989 and 1993. UG got 74,605 votes (4.67%) in the general elections and 44,902 votes (3.07%) in the Galician ones.

After the election failure, UG joined the BNG in 1994. On the 20 of September 2003 UG decided to disappear as a political party and became an "opinion current" inside the BNG.

References

 Beramendi, X.G. and Núñez Seixas, X.M. (1996): O nacionalismo galego. A Nosa Terra, Vigo
 Beramendi, X.G. (2007): De provincia a nación. Historia do galeguismo político. Xerais, Vigo

Defunct nationalist parties in Spain
Defunct socialist parties in Galicia (Spain)
Galician nationalist parties
Left-wing nationalist parties
Political parties established in 1991
1991 establishments in Spain
Former member parties of the Galician Nationalist Bloc